Smoke-a-Lot Records, distributed by Rap-a-Lot Records, is a record label founded and owned by rapper Yukmouth and manager Kat Gaynor. The name comes from Yukmouth's Luniz nickname, "Smoke-a-Lot". The label itself is home to artists including Luniz, Dru Down, Thug Lordz (Yukmouth & C-Bo), The Regime, and Yukmouth himself. It is also home to newcomers Ampichino, Nyce, Young Dru, and Marc Shyst.  Attached to the label as in-house DJ is former Cali Untouchable DJ, DJ Fingaz.

Discography

Studio albums
1998: Thugged Out: The Albulation (Yukmouth)
2001: Thug Lord: The New Testament (Yukmouth)
2002: Silver & Black (The Luniz)
2002: United Ghettos of America Vol. 1 (Yukmouth presents)
2003: Godzilla (Yukmouth)
2004: In Thugz We Trust (Thug Lordz)
2004: United Ghettos of America Vol. 2 (Yukmouth presents)
2008: Million Dollar Mouthpiece (Yukmouth)
2009: The West Coast Don (Yukmouth)
2010: Free at Last (Yukmouth)
2010: Thug Money (Thug Lordz)
2010: Thuggin' & Mobbin' (Yukmouth)
2012: Half Baked (Yukmouth)
2013: The Last Dragon (The Regime)
2013: Dragon Gang (The Regime)
2014: GAS (Grow And Sale) (Yukmouth)

Official mixtapes
 2005:  All Out War Vol. 1 (The Regime)
 2005:  All Out War Vol. 2 (The Regime)
 2006:  AK-47 Soundtrack to the Street''' (Yukmouth presents Ampichino)
 2006:  Superheroes: Hot Az A Heata Vol. 2 (Yukmouth presents Young Skrilla)
 2006:  Million Dollar Game (Yukmouth)
 2007:  All Out War Vol. 3 (The Regime)
 2007:  The City of Dope Vol. 1 (Yukmouth)
 2011:  Like A Beast Vol. 3'' (Faze)

Artists
Yukmouth
Thug Lordz
The Regime
Jamal a.k.a. Mally G
Luniz
Faze
Young Dru
Lee Majors
J-Hood
SkrillaOnSet
1700ZI
Skrill-Dilly/Yung Skrilla

See also 
 List of record labels

External links
 Official site

American record labels
Hip hop record labels
Record labels established in 1998
Vanity record labels
Gangsta rap record labels